Misery Me is a 1959 Australian television movie, or rather a live television play, which aired on ABC. It was a satirical comedy written by British playwright Dennis Cannan and had originally been a stage play.

At the time, most TV plays presented on Australian television were adaptations of overseas stage plays. It is likely that the experience gained from these productions allowed ABC to later produce dramatic programs with more local interest, such as Stormy Petrel.

The program was originally shown in Sydney (on ABN-2) on 15 July 1959. A kinescope ("telerecording") was made of the program and later shown in Melbourne on 5 August 1959 (on ABV-2). In 1959, two additional ABC stations began operations, in Adelaide and Brisbane respectively, and it is not known of the program was also shown in these two cities.

The archival status of the program is not known.

Plot
A young couple make a suicide pact at a mountain resort. Matters are complicated by the arrival of two former suitors of the girl, Cornelia.

Cast

Diana Davidson  as Cornelia
Gordon Glenwright  as Carlo Bambas
Lionel Stevens as Julius Ring
Barbara Eather 
John Huson
Don Pascoe
Hugh Stewart

Production
The play had been performed in 1955 and adapted for TV on the BBC in 1955.

Reception
According to director Alan Burke the play received "tiny ratings" like many ABC plays around this time.

The critic from the Sydney Morning Herald wrote that the "oddly uneven ingredients of political satire and romantic farce" that featured in the play "were not mixed with enough smoothness" to make the TV adaptation "entirely satisfying" adding that the play suffered from being reduced to an hour ("hardly gave the players or the ideas time to properly ferment"). However he did think there that "when attractive acting was combined with flexible production" there were "some charming and amusing individual scenes."

See also
Blue Murder
Black Limelight
Bodgie
List of live television plays broadcast on Australian Broadcasting Corporation (1950s)

References

External links
Misery Me at IMDb

1959 television plays
Australian television plays
Australian Broadcasting Corporation original programming
English-language television shows
Black-and-white Australian television shows
Australian live television shows
Films directed by Alan Burke (director)